Menga is a Kongo and Italian surname. Notable people with this family name include:
Addy-Waku Menga (born 1983), German footballer from DR Congo
Aleixo-Platini Menga (born 1987), German sprinter from Angola
Dolly Menga (born 1993), Angolan footballer
Evangelista Menga (1480–1571), Italian military engineer
Joseph Menga (1932–1998), French politician
Rosa Menga (born 1992), Italian politician
Vanessa Menga (born 1976), former tennis player from Brazil

References

Kongo-language surnames
Italian-language surnames
Surnames of Italian origin